Frederick Henry William Gough-Calthorpe, 5th Baron Calthorpe (24 July 1826 – 25 June 1893), was a British Liberal Party politician.

Background and education
Born in London, Calthorpe was the eldest son of Frederick Gough, 4th Baron Calthorpe, and Lady Charlotte Sophia Somerset, daughter of Henry Somerset, 6th Duke of Beaufort. He was educated at Eton and Trinity College, Cambridge.

Political career
Calthorpe was elected to the House of Commons as one of the two Members of Parliament (MPs) for Worcestershire East at a by-election in February 1859.  He was re-elected at the general election later in 1859 and again in 1865, and held the seat until May 1868, when he succeeded his father in the barony and took his seat in the House of Lords.

Personal life
Lord Calthorpe, a member of the Gough-Calthorpe family, died at Grosvenor Square, London, in June 1893, aged 66. He never married and was succeeded in the barony by his younger brother, Augustus Gough-Calthorpe, 6th Baron Calthorpe.

Arms

References

External links 
 

1826 births
1893 deaths
Gough-Calthorpe family
Liberal Party (UK) MPs for English constituencies
UK MPs 1857–1859
UK MPs 1865–1868
Calthorpe, B5
People educated at Eton College
Alumni of Trinity College, Cambridge
5